First Alert is the retail brand of American safety equipment manufacturer BRK Brands, Inc., established in 1976 and based in Aurora, Illinois, with a production plant in Juarez, Mexico. Products sold with the brand include carbon monoxide detectors, smoke alarms, fire extinguishers, and other safety products like flashlights and fire escape ladders. First Alert supports fire safety in partnership with Safe Kids USA and The United States Fire Administration, providing smoke alarms at reduced cost to low-income families in the United States.

History 
 1958-company created by Burke-Roberts-Kimberlin (BRK) Electronics. The three-man team (Burke-Roberts-Kimberlin) invented the first battery-powered smoke detector
1964- Began commercial manufacturing of the first battery-powered smoke detector
1967- Pittway began manufacturing the alarms
1974-Sears begins selling the BRK model SS-74R battery powered smoke alarm
1992-Sold to T.H. Lee & Associates 
1998-Sold to Sunbeam Corporation
2002-American Household, Inc. is formed from Sunbeam Corporation
2005-Jarden Corporation (NYSE: JAH) purchases American Household, Inc.
2006-BRK Brands/ First Alert becomes part of Jarden Branded Consumables.
2016-Newell Rubbermaid acquires Jarden, including BRK Brands, forming Newell Brands.
2022-Resideo Technologies acquires First Alert

Awards
2009 DIY, Garden & Housewares "Silver" Industry Award in Security & Safety- Tundra [UK, Europe]
2008 Chicago Innovation Award- Tundra
2007 International Housewares Show "Best of Show"- Tundra
2006 Golden Hammer Gold Level Award Winner 
2005 Golden Hammer Gold Level Award Winner
2004 Golden Hammer Gold Level Award Winner
2003 Golden Hammer Gold Level Award Winner
2002 SPARC Award Winner
2001 Popular Mechanics Editor's Choice Award for SA302
2001 Good Housekeeping "Good Buy" Award for SA302
1999 CHAMPS Award for winning marketing strategy in the consumer category
1999 EFFIE Award for "Be Safe...Replace" campaign, most effective advertising campaign in the health aids category
1997 Pinnacle Award for the Standard for Excellence

Recalls
First Alert branded fire extinguishers model FE1A10G with serial numbers beginning with RH, RK, RL, RP, RT, RU, or RW were recalled. Fire Extinguishers were sold from September 1999 through September 2000.

In May 2006, First Alert combination smoke alarms were recalled due to draining batteries rapidly.

References

External links

Companies based in DuPage County, Illinois
Manufacturing companies established in 1958
Fire protection
Manufacturing companies based in Illinois
1958 establishments in Illinois
1992 mergers and acquisitions
1998 mergers and acquisitions
2005 mergers and acquisitions